Watchmen: Original Motion Picture Score is a film score album for the 2009 film Watchmen. It was released concurrently with the soundtrack album Watchmen: Music from the Motion Picture.

Track listing

See also 
 Watchmen: Music from the Motion Picture

Notes 

2009 soundtrack albums
Film scores
Warner Records soundtracks
Watchmen (film)
DC Comics film soundtracks
Tyler Bates soundtracks